The Ghost of Tom Joad is the eleventh studio album, and the second acoustic album, by American recording artist Bruce Springsteen, released on November 21, 1995, by Columbia Records. It reached the top ten in two countries, and the top twenty in five more, including No. 11 in the United States, his first studio album to fail to reach the top ten in the US in over two decades. It won the Grammy Award for Best Contemporary Folk Album.

Composition 
Springsteen wrote and recorded the album between March and September, 1995, at Thrill Hill West, his home studio in Los Angeles, California. Following that year's studio reunion with the E Street Band and the release of Greatest Hits, Springsteen's writing activity had increased significantly, resulting in this album, which consists of seven solo tracks and five band tracks.

Most tracks are backed by acoustic guitar work and the lyrics are generally a somber reflection of life in the mid-1990s in America and Mexico. The character of Tom Joad entered the American consciousness in John Steinbeck’s 1939 Pulitzer Prize-winning novel, The Grapes of Wrath, set against the economic hardships of the Great Depression. This spawned a film version starring Henry Fonda, which in turn inspired folk singer Woody Guthrie to pen "The Ballad of Tom Joad".

Springsteen was also influenced by Dale Maharidge and Michael Williamson's 1985 study of homelessness, Journey to Nowhere: The Saga of the New Underclass. The album's release was followed by Springsteen's solo acoustic Ghost of Tom Joad Tour, which ran from 1995 to 1997 and took place in mostly small venues.

Release
The Ghost of Tom Joad debuted at number eleven on the US Billboard 200 chart, with 107,000 copies sold in its first week. However, it broke a string of eight consecutive Top 5 studio albums in the United States for Springsteen. The album won the 1997 Grammy Award for Best Contemporary Folk Album.

Critical reception

The Ghost of Tom Joad received mostly favorable reviews, but also drew some sharp criticism. Mikal Gilmore of Rolling Stone called it "Springsteen's best album in ten years," and considered it "among the bravest work that anyone has given us this decade." He characterised it as Springsteen's "first overtly social statement since Born in the U.S.A.", and as having "an obvious kinship with Spingsteen’s 1982 masterwork, Nebraska", the artist's first acoustic album. Bill Wyman of The Chicago Reader expressed disappointment that "Springsteen can be so literal that it's hard to appreciate some of the record's subtleties." He criticized the album for being "stolidly depoppified to ensure that no one will derive actual pleasure from it."

In The Village Voices annual Pazz & Jop critics poll for the year's best albums, The Ghost of Tom Joad placed at No. 8. Robert Christgau, the poll's creator, simultaneously commended and criticized the album for being "the most courageous and the most depressing of the year," pointing out that Springsteen was the only artist in the poll's Top 40 "to directly address the war on the poor (and, increasingly, what is called the middle class) that is now the political agenda of the industrialized world." He also took aim at what he said was Springsteen's choice "to muffle his songs, so that only those who really want to hear their despair will bother trying." Christgau lamented that the "tunes, arrangements, and mysteriously praised 'phrasing' aren’t just forbiddingly minimal — often they’re rather careless", and dubbed the album "a bore".

Track listing
All songs are written by Bruce Springsteen.

Unreleased outtakes
Twelve of the 22 songs recorded during the album's sessions made the final cut while "Dead Man Walkin'" was released on the soundtrack for the movie Dead Man Walking and later on The Essential Bruce Springsteen and "Brothers Under the Bridge" was released on Tracks. "I'm Turning Into Elvis" and "It's the Little Things That Count" remain unreleased; however, they were performed live while "Idiot's Delight" and "I'm Not Sleeping" were also performed live and along with "1945" and "Cheap Motel" were co-written with Joe Grushecky, who recorded the four songs for his 1997 album Coming Home.
 "Cynthia"
 "Tiger Rose"
 "I'm Turning Into Elvis"
 "It's the Little Things That Count"
 "Idiot's Delight"
 "I'm Not Sleeping"
 "1945"
 "Cheap Motel"

Personnel
Credits as listed in the album liner notes.

Musicians
 Bruce Springsteen – vocal (tracks 1-12), guitar (tracks 1-12), harmonica (tracks 1, 10), keyboard (tracks 3, 5-7, 11, 12)
 Danny Federici – keyboard (tracks 1, 2, 8, 10), accordion (track 10)
Chuck Plotkin – keyboard (track 4)
 Gary Mallaber – drums (tracks 1, 2, 4, 8, 10), percussion (tracks 2, 4)
 Marty Rifkin – pedal steel guitar (tracks 1, 2, 4, 10)
 Garry Tallent – bass (tracks 1, 8)
 Jim Hanson – bass (tracks 2, 4)
Jennifer Condos – bass (track 10)
 Soozie Tyrell – violin (tracks 2, 4, 8, 10), backing vocal (track 10)
 Lisa Lowell – backing vocal (track 10)
 Patti Scialfa – backing vocal (track 10)

Technical

 Bruce Sprinigsteen, Chuck Plotkin – production
 Toby Scott – engineering and mixing
 Greg Goldman – engineering assistant
Gary Myerberg – technical maintenance
Shari Sutcliff – musician contracts
 Terry Magovern – research
 Sandra Choron – art direction
Harry Choron – art production
 Eric Dinyer – cover art
 Pam Springsteen – interior photographs

Charts

Weekly charts

Year-end charts

Certifications and sales

References

External links
 

Bruce Springsteen albums
1995 albums
Grammy Award for Best Contemporary Folk Album
Albums produced by Chuck Plotkin
Columbia Records albums
Albums produced by Toby Scott